No Exit is a play by Jean-Paul Sartre.

No Exit may also refer to:

Film and theatre 
Adaptations of Sartre's play:
 No Exit (1954 film) (Huis clos), directed by Jacqueline Audry
 No Exit (1962 film), directed by Tad Danielewski
 No Exit (opera), a 2008 chamber opera by Andy Vores
 No Exit (1930 film), a British  romantic comedy film directed by Charles Saunders
 No Exit (1995 film), a 1995 Canadian action film directed by Damian Lee
 No Exit (2022 film), a 2022 thriller film directed by Damian Power

Music 
 No Exit (Blondie album), 1999
 "No Exit" (song), the title song, 1999
 No Exit (Fates Warning album), and its title song, 1988
 No Exit (The Angels album), 1979
 "No Exit", a 2017 song by Chris Brown from Heartbreak on a Full Moon

Television episodes 
 "No Exit" (The 4400)
 "No Exit" (Battlestar Galactica)
 "No Exit" (Law & Order: Criminal Intent)
 "No Exit" (Miami Vice)
 "No Exit" (Supernatural)
 "No Exit" (The West Wing)
 "No Exit" (The Vampire Diaries)

Other 
 No Exit, a 1990 video game
 Demolition Racer: No Exit, the Sega Dreamcast enhanced port of the video game Demolition Racer
 "No Exit", an article in The New Republic by Betsy McCaughey

See also